Alibi (also known as The Perfect Alibi, Nightstick and The Bat Whispers) is a 1929 American pre-Code crime film directed by Roland West. The screenplay was written by West and C. Gardner Sullivan, who adapted the 1927 Broadway stage play, Nightstick, written by Elaine Sterne Carrington, J.C. Nugent, Elliott Nugent, and John Wray. 

The movie is a crime drama starring Chester Morris, Harry Stubbs, Mae Busch, and Regis Toomey. Director West experimented a great deal with sound, music, and camera angles.

Plot

Joan Manning, the daughter of a police sergeant, secretly marries Chick Williams, a gangleader who convinces her that he is leading an honest life. Chick attends the theater with Joan and, at the intermission, sneaks away, committing a robbery during which a policeman is killed. Chick is suspected of the crime but is able to use Joan to substantiate his alibi. The police plant Danny McGann, an undercover agent, in Chick's gang; but he is discovered, and Chick murders him. Chick is later cornered by the police in his own home. Before they can arrest him, he flips the light switch, plunging the room into darkness. In the midst of the chaos, Chick escapes to the roof. He attempts to jump off to a nearby building, but stumbles on the landing, thus falling to his death.

Cast
Chester Morris as Chick Williams
Harry Stubbs as Buck Bachman
Mae Busch as Daisy Thomas
Eleanor Griffith as Joan Manning Williams
Regis Toomey as Danny McGann
Purnell Pratt as Police Sgt. Pete Manning
Irma Harrison as Toots
Elmer Ballard as Soft Malone, cab driver (uncredited)
James Bradbury Jr. as Blake, a crook (uncredited)
Ed Brady as George Stanislaus David (uncredited)
Kernan Cripps as Trask, the plainclothesman (uncredited)
Virginia Flohri as the singer in the theater (uncredited)
Al Hill as Brown, a crook (uncredited)
DeWitt Jennings as Officer O'Brien (uncredited)

Reception
The film was nominated for three Academy Awards, including for Best Picture (Roland West), Best Actor in a Leading Role (Chester Morris) and Best Art Direction (William Cameron Menzies).Time praised it as "more credible than most crook pictures," and The New York Times said it was "by far the best of the gangster films, and the fact that it is equipped with dialogue makes it all the more stirring." In a retrospective review, Bruce G. Hallenbeck said the film was "creaky by today's standards...[but] still fun to watch."

Chicago banned the film, citing it for "immorality, criminality, and depravity."

References

External links 

1929 films
1920s English-language films
Films directed by Roland West
American black-and-white films
American crime thriller films
American police detective films
American films based on plays
1920s crime thriller films
1920s police films
1920s American films